Montereale is a comune and town in the province of L'Aquila, in the Abruzzo, region of Italy. It is located in the  Gran Sasso e Monti della Laga National Park.

See also
1703 Apennine earthquakes

Montereale, Abruzzo